KJMO (97.5 FM) is a radio station serving Central Missouri with a classic hits music format. This station operates on 97.5 MHz HD and is under ownership of Cumulus Broadcasting. 

, much of the programming featured on KJMO was from Scott Shannon's The True Oldies Channel from ABC Radio. Richard Matthews was the live and local morning show host.

On March 27, 2018, Cumulus filed to transfer KJMO and three other stations (WTOD, WPCK, and WNUQ) into the Cumulus Reorganization Divestiture Trust for a future sale. , KJMO had dropped its oldies format, by then provided by Westwood One's Good Time Oldies format, in favor of the classic hits format previously heard on sister station KZJF; Cumulus had shut down KZJF and surrendered its license to the Federal Communications Commission (FCC), eliminating the need for the company to sell KJMO or any other station in the Columbia/Jefferson City market as part of its bankruptcy restructuring.

References

External links
KJMO official website

JMO
Classic hits radio stations in the United States
Radio stations established in 2006
2006 establishments in Missouri
Cumulus Media radio stations